Bourke an Anglo-Norman Irish surname, a variant of the surname Burke, deriving from the ancient Anglo-Norman and Hiberno-Norman noble dynasty, the House of Burgh. In Ireland, the descendants of William de Burgh (c.1160–1206) had the surname de Burgh which was gaelicised in Irish as de Búrca and over the centuries became Búrc then Burke and Bourke.

Notable people with this name include:

Surname

A
 Al Bourke or Alan Stamford (born 1928), Australian boxer of the 1940s and 1950s
 Anselm Bourke or Msgr Anselm (Nicholas) Bourke (1835–1924), Irish-Australian Roman Catholic priest
 Arthur Roston Bourke, English association football referee and administrator

B

 Balthazar Bourke (fl. 1607), Irish soldier and Knight of Santiago
 Barry Bourke (born 1943), Australian rules footballer 
 Betty Bourke (née Lucas), (1924–2015), New Zealand politician and health administrator
 Bill Bourke (disambiguation)
 Bill Bourke (footballer, born 1882) (1882–1932), Australian rules footballer 
 Bill Bourke (politician) or William Meskill Bourke (1913–1981), Australian politician
 Bill Bourke (footballer, born 1927) (1927–2002), Australian rules footballer 
 Brian Bourke (born 1936), Irish artist
 Bruce Bourke (born 1929), Australian former swimmer

C
 Cecil Bourke or Cecil Frederick Joseph Bourke (1841–1910), British cleric and Archdeacon of Buckingham
 Charles Bourke (c.1765–1820), Irish priest
 Chris Bourke, Australian politician
 Ciarán Bourke (1935–1988), Irish singer and folk musician
 Colin Bourke (born 1984), Japanese rugby sevens player

D

 Damian Bourke (born 1965), Australian rules footballer
 Daniel Bourke (1886–1952), Irish Fianna Fáil politician
 Darren Bourke (born 1970), Australian rules footballer
 Daryl Bourke (born 1965), Australian rules footballer 
 David Bourke (born 1976), Australian rules footballer
 David Noel Bourke (born 1970), Denmark-based, Irish-born independent filmmaker
 Dermot Bourke, 7th Earl of Mayo (1851–1927), Anglo-Irish peer

E

 Eddie Bourke or Edmund Francis Bourke (1852–1926), Irish-South African politician and businessman
 Edmund Bourke (1761–1821) (1761–1821), Danish statesman
 Edwin Bourke (1836–1915), Canadian farmer and political figure in Manitoba
 Eva Bourke (born 1946), German-born Irish poet
 Evelyn Bourke (born 1965), Irish businesswoman

F

 Fannie Bourke or Fan Bourke or Fannie Burke, (1886–1959), American stage and film actress
 Fiona Bourke (born 1988), New Zealand rower
 Francis Bourke or Francis William Bourke (born 1947), Australian rules footballer 
 Frank Bourke or Francis Michael "Frank" Bourke (1922–2011), Australian rules footballer

G
 Gillian Bourke (born 1984), Irish female rugby union player
 Glenn Bourke (born 1960), Australian sailor
 Greg Bourke, Australian professional rugby league footballer

H
 Henry Bourke or Brigadier Henry Sackville Joynt Bourke (1900–1983), British Army officer
 Harry Legge-Bourke or Sir Henry Legge-Bourke (1914–1973) British politician

J

 Joanna Bourke (born 1963), British-based historian
 Joe Bourke (1884–1932), Australian rules footballer 
 John Bourke (disambiguation)
 John Bourke (Australian politician) (1901–1970), Australian politician
 John Bourke (footballer) (born 1953), Scottish footballer
 John Bourke, 1st Earl of Mayo (–1790), Irish politician and peer
 John Bourke, 2nd Earl of Mayo (–1792), Irish politician and peer
 John Bourke, 4th Earl of Mayo (1766–1849), Irish politician and peer
 John Gregory Bourke (1846–1896), American Civil War medal of honor recipient
 John Philip Bourke (1860–1914), Australian poet
 Sir John Bourke of Brittas, Irish Roman Catholic, hanged for refusing to renounce his faith
 Jordon Bourke (born 1994), Australian rules footballer
 Joseph Bourke (1772–1843), Irish Anglican priest
 Joseph Bourke, 3rd Earl of Mayo or Joseph Deane Bourke (1736–1794), Irish peer and cleric

K

 Katherine Bourke, Australian lawyer and judge
 Ken Bourke (born 1958), Australian professional rugby league footballer

L
 Latika Bourke (born 1984), Australian author and journalist
 Lindsay Bourke or Lindsay Blue (born 1945), Australian classical and ambient musician, visual artist and poet

M

 Margaret Bourke (1945–2021), Australian bridge player
 Margaret Bourke-White (1904–1971), American photographer
 Martin Bourke (disambiguation)
 Martin Bourke (diplomat), (born 1947), British diplomat, governor of the Turks and Caicos Islands
 Martin Bourke (footballer), (born 1936), Australian rules footballer
 Martin Bourke (politician), (1867–1939), American lawyer and politician from New York
 Mary Bourke-Dowling (1882–1944), Irish suffragette and republican
 Mary Robinson (nee Bourke; born 1944), Irish politician and 7th President of Ireland
 Matthew Bourke (born 1968), Australian rules footballer 
 Maurice Bourke (1853–1900), British Royal Navy officer
 Meiler Bourke or Miles Bourke, 11th Mac William Iochtar (died 1520), Irish chieftain and noble 
 Michael Bourke (born 1941) British cleric and Bishop of Wolverhampton
 Miles Bourke (1925–1982), Australian farmer

N
 Nicholas Bourke, Anglo-Irish planter in Jamaica
 Norah Lindsay or Norah Mary Madeleine Bourke (1873–1948), Anglo-Irish socialite and garden designer

P
 Paddy Bourke (disambiguation)
 Paddy Bourke (footballer) (1883–1930), Australian rules footballer
 Paddy Bourke (politician), Irish politician
 Paget Bourke or Sir Paget John Bourke (1906–1983), British colonial judge
 Pat Bourke (disambiguation)
 Pat Bourke (footballer, born 1894) (1894–1982), Australian footballer for Melbourne
 Pat Bourke (footballer, born 1923) (1923–2005), Australian footballer for South Melbourne
 Pat Bourke (musician), guitarist with the band Dallas Crane
 Peter Bourke (runner) (born 1958), Australian former middle-distance runner
 Pieter Bourke Australian musician, composer, producer and audio engineer

R

 Richard Bourke (disambiguation)
 Ricard Bourke, 9th Mac William Iochtar (died 1509), Irish chieftain and noble 
 Ricard Ó Cuairsge Bourke, 7th Mac William Iochtar (died1473), Irish chieftain and noble 
 Ricard mac Seaán an Tearmainn Bourke, 16th Mac William Iochtar (died 1571), Irish chieftain and noble 
 Richard Bourke, 6th Earl of Mayo or Richard Southwell Bourke (1822–1872), Irish statesman
 Richard Bourke (academic) (born 1965), Irish academic
 Richard Bourke (bishop) (1767–1832), Irish bishop
 Richard the Iron Bourke, 18th Mac William Iochtar (died 1583), Irish chieftain and noble
 Richard Bourke (d. 1586), 19th Mac William Iochtar (died 1586), Irish chieftain and noble
 Richard "the Devils Hook" Bourke, 22nd Mac William Iochtar (died 1601), Irish chieftain and noble
 Richard Bourke or Sir Richard Bourke (1777–1855), 8th Governor of New South Wales
 Rick Bourke or Richard Bourke (1953–2006), Australian rugby league footballer
 Robert Bourke, 1st Baron Connemara (1827–1902), British Conservative politician and colonial administrator
 Roger Bourke White (1911–2002), American businessman
 Russell Bourke, Autstralian engineer

S
 Sean Bourke or Sean Aloyisious Bourke (1934–1982) Irish prisoner
 Seaán mac Oliver Bourke or Seaán mac Oliver (John) Bourke, 17th Mac William Íochtar and 1st Baron Ardenerie (died 1580), Irish noble
 Shân Legge-Bourke (born 1943), Welsh landowner
 Shane Bourke (born 1988) is an Irish sportsperson
 Stan Bourke, Australian professional soccer player 
 Stephen Bourke, Australian archaeologist

T

 Ted Bourke or Edward Arthur Bourke (1904–1952), Australian rules footballer 
 Ted Bourke (footballer, born 1925) or Edward Thomas Bourke (1925–2014), Australian rules footballer
 Terence Bourke, 10th Earl of Mayo or Terence Patrick Bourke (1929–2006), Anglo-Irish peer
 Theobald Bourke (disambiguation)
 Theobald Bourke, 8th Mac William Iochtar (died 1503), Irish chieftain and noble
 Theobald mac Uilleag Bourke, 14th Mac William Iochtar (died 1537), Irish chieftain and noble
 Theobald Bourke (Irish MP) (c.1683–1726), Irish politician and MP
 Thomas Bourke (disambiguation)
 Thomas Bourke (cricketer) or Thomas Joseph Deane Bourke (1815–1875), Irish cricketer
 Thomas E. Bourke or Thomas Eugene Bourke (1896–1978), United States Marine Corps general
 Thomas Bourke, 4th Baron Bourke of Connell, 4th Baron Bourke of Connell (d. 1599), Irish noble
 Tom Bourke (1918–2001), Australian rugby league footballer
 Tibbot MacWalter Kittagh Bourke or Theobald FitzWalter Kittagh Bourke, 21st Mac William Iochtar (c.1570–c.1602), Irish chieftain and noble
 Tibbot ne Long Bourke, 1st Viscount Mayo or Theobald Bourke, 1st Viscount Mayo (1567–1629), Irish peer and parliamentarian
 Tiggy Legge-Bourke (born 1965), former British royal nanny
 Tim Bourke (footballer) (born 1969), Australian rules footballer
 Tim Bourke, Australian bridge player and author
 Tony Bourke (Australian politician) or Anthony James Bourke (born 1941), Australian politician
 Tony Bourke (born 1976), Australian rules footballer
 Troy Bourke (born 1994), Canadian professional ice hockey player

V

 Vernon Bourke (1907–1998), Canadian-American Philosopher
 Vin Bourke or Vincent Valera Bourke (born 1933), Australian rules footballer

W
 William Bourke (disambiguation)
 William "the Blind Abbot" Bourke, 20th Mac William Iochtar (died 1593), Irish chieftain and noble
 William Bourke, 1st Baron Bourke of Connell, 1st Baron Bourke of Connell (died 1584), Irish noble
 William Bourke Cockran (Bourke Cockran or Burke Cochran), (1854–1923), Irish-American politician and orator

Given name 
 Aylmer Bourke Lambert (1761–1842), British botanist and one of the first fellows of the Linnean Society
 Bourke B. Hickenlooper or Bourke Blakemore Hickenlooper (1896–1971), American attorney and politician
 Philip Bourke Marston (1850–1887), English poet

See also
 Bourke (disambiguation)
 House of Burgh, an Anglo-Norman and Hiberno-Norman dynasty founded in 1193
 Earl of Mayo, earldom created in the Peerage of Ireland in 1785
 Baron Bourke of Castleconnell, barony created in the Peerage of Ireland in 1580
 Baron Bourke of Brittas, barony created in the Peerage of Ireland in 1618
 Baron Ardenerie, barony created in the Peerage of Ireland in 1580
 Viscount Bourke of Clanmorries, viscountcy created in the Peerage of Ireland in 1629
 Baron Connemara, barony created in the Peerage of the United Kingdom in 1887
 de Burgh, surname
 Burke, surname

References